Frederick T. Melges (2 December 1935 – 29 July 1988) was an American psychiatrist and professor of psychiatry at Stanford University School of Medicine, notable for his interest in time and for his pioneering work on the role of distortions of time in various psychiatric disorders.

Career 
Melges led research work at Stanford University in the 1970s on cannabis users. Melges and colleagues were the first to report that cannabis induced "temporal disintegration" or a disorganization of sequential thought and impaired goal-directedness. This phenomenon stems partly from impaired immediate memory. Melges and colleagues also showed that depersonalization is closely associated with the degree of temporal disintegration. This work led Melges to conclude that the disorientation in the sense of time might represent a key action of the drug from which many other effects followed.

Melges went on to propose a future oriented therapy. Melges (1982, p. 35) argued that: "Many forms of mental illness are characterized by a bleak, foreshortened or fragmented future time perspective." He proposed that time distortions are prevalent in psychiatric illnesses and that they can cloud the personal future of an individual distorting their view of their future and thereby disrupting goal-directed behavior. Melges's emphasis on the importance of the future in understanding mental illness provided a framework for focusing psychiatric treatment on time and the future. The most significant work to document his findings on the essential value of time and his ideas on future oriented therapy are found in his only book, Time and the Inner Future (1982).

Melges suffered from Type I diabetes and at times wondered whether he would live to see his life's work completed. In his book's epilogue, Melges explains:

While I was writing this book, my own future was under almost constant threat. The specter of death made time ever so precious.
Since I had been conducting studies on time and the mind for 18 years, and since I had come to realize the importance of time and the personal future in clinical work with my patients, I had a great desire to complete this book before I died.
The year that I started the first draft was the very year that the long-term complications of my juvenile diabetes began to take their greatest toll. (p. 289)

During his battle with diabetes, Melges's kidneys failed, and required a transplant, which at the age of 43 was donated to him by his mother. Melges died years later, in 1988.

See also
Cybernetics
Time perception

Notes

Selected bibliography
 
 
 
 
 

1935 births
1988 deaths
American psychiatrists
Cannabis researchers
20th-century American physicians
Stanford University School of Medicine faculty